Jean Boulanger (1606–1660) was a French painter active in Italy during the Baroque period.

He was born in Troyes, France. He appears to have had some training under Guido Reni in Bologna. One of his more famous works are the frescoes at the Ducal palace of Sassuolo. He was buried in the church of San Vicenzio in Modena. His pupils include Tommaso Costa and Sigismondo Caula at Modena.

References

1606 births
1660 deaths
17th-century French painters
French male painters
17th-century Italian painters
Italian male painters
Painters from Modena
Italian Baroque painters